The Deep Ones are creatures in the Cthulhu Mythos of H. P. Lovecraft. The beings first appeared in Lovecraft's novella The Shadow over Innsmouth (1931), but were already hinted at in the early short story "Dagon". The Deep Ones are a race of intelligent ocean-dwelling creatures, approximately human-shaped but with a fishy appearance. The females would regularly mate with voluntary human males along the coast, creating societies of hybrids.

Numerous Mythos elements are associated with the Deep Ones, including the legendary town of Innsmouth, the undersea city of Y'ha-nthlei, the Esoteric Order of Dagon, and the beings known as Father Dagon and Mother Hydra. After their debut in Lovecraft's tale, the sea-dwelling creatures resurfaced in the works of other authors, especially August Derleth.

Summary
The Deep Ones are an ancient species of amphibious sea-dwelling humanoids, whose preferred habitat is the deep ocean. A description is offered by the narrator of The Shadow Over Innsmouth:

A very similar description is provided in the much-earlier story Dagon:

A significant difference between the two narratives is that the single creature observed by the narrator is of a vast size, whereas the beings seen off Innsmouth are roughly human in scale. Despite being primarily marine creatures, Deep Ones can survive on land for extended periods of time. They possess biological immortality, and never die except by accident or violence. They worship twin deities, the cult of whom they have introduced among the human population of Innsmouth, who know them as "Father Dagon and Mother Hydra" - however, the elderly derelict (and Order of Dagon initiate) Zadok Allen invokes Cthulhu in a moment of strong emotion, and Robert M. Price has suggested that "Dagon" may have merely been "the closest biblical analogy to the real object of worship of the deep ones" The Deep Ones are or were opposed by mysterious beings known as the Old Ones, who have left behind magical artifacts that can keep them in check. This detail is one of the vestigial hints that August Derleth developed into the mostly unnamed Elder Gods.

Esoteric Order of Dagon

The Esoteric Order of Dagon was the primary religion in Innsmouth after Marsh returned from the South Seas with the dark religion circa 1838. It quickly took root due to its promises of expensive gold artifacts and fish, which were desired by the primarily-fishing town.

The central beings worshipped by the Order were the Father Dagon and Mother Hydra, and, to a lesser extent, Cthulhu. Dagon and Hydra were seen largely as intermediaries between the various gods rather than as gods themselves. Even so, the cultists sacrificed various locals to the Deep Ones at specific times in exchange for a limitless supply of gold and fish. When they ran out of locals, they would go to other places to kidnap people to be sacrificed. Eventually, things became so bad that the US government sent the police force to apprehend Marsh and his cult.

The Esoteric Order of Dagon (which masqueraded as the local Masonic movement) had three oaths that members had to take. The first was an oath of secrecy, the second, an oath of loyalty, and the third, an oath to marry a Deep One and bear or sire its child.  Due to the latter oath, interbreeding became the norm in Innsmouth, resulting in widespread deformities and many half-breeds.

The Esoteric Order of Dagon was seemingly destroyed when one of Obed Marsh's "lost descendants" sent the U.S. Treasury Department to seize the town. As a result, the town was more or less destroyed and the Order was thought disbanded.

Deep One hybrid
The backstory of The Shadow over Innsmouth involves a bargain between Deep Ones and humans, in which the aquatic species provides plentiful fishing and gold in the form of strangely formed jewelry. In return, the land-dwellers give human sacrifices and a promise of "mixing"—the mating of humans with Deep Ones. Although the Deep One hybrid offspring are born with the appearance of a normal human being, the individual will eventually transform into a Deep One, gaining immortality—by default—only when the transformation is complete.

The transformation usually occurs when the individual reaches middle age. As the hybrid gets older, he or she begins to acquire the so-called "Innsmouth Look" as he or she takes on more and more attributes of the Deep One race: the ears shrink, the eyes bulge and become unblinking, the head narrows and gradually goes bald, the skin becomes scabrous as it changes into scales, and the neck develops folds which later become gills. When the hybrid becomes too obviously non-human, it is hidden away from outsiders. Eventually, however, the hybrid will be compelled to slip into the sea to live with the Deep Ones in one of their undersea cities.

Father Dagon and Mother Hydra

Mother Hydra and her consort Father Dagon are both Deep Ones overgrown after millennia ruling over their lesser brethren. Together with Cthulhu, they form the triad of gods worshipped by the Deep Ones (their names are inspired by Dragon, or Dagon, the Semitic fertility deity, and the Hydra of Greek mythology).

Mother Hydra is not to be confused with the entity in Henry Kuttner's story "Hydra".

Y'ha-nthlei

"Cyclopean and many-columned Y'ha-nthlei" is the only Deep One city named by Lovecraft.  It is described as a great undersea metropolis below Devil's Reef just off the coast of Massachusetts, near the town of Innsmouth. Its exact age is not known, but one resident is said to have lived there for 80,000 years.  In Lovecraft's story, the U.S. government torpedoed Devil's Reef, and Y'ha-nthlei was presumed destroyed, although the ending of the story implies it survived.

The name Y'ha-nthlei may have been inspired by the Lord Dunsany character "Yoharneth-Lahai", "the god of little dreams and fancies" who "sendeth little dreams out of PEGANA to please the people of Earth."

Other authors have invented Deep One cities in other parts of the ocean, including Ahu-Y'hloa near Cornwall and G'll-Hoo, near the volcanic island of Surtsey off the coast of Iceland.

Anders Fager has described the city of "Ya' Dich-Gho" as located in the Stockholm skerries. It is accidentally destroyed in 1982 during a Swedish submarine-hunt. At least two surviving Deep Ones live in Stockholm. One of them sells aquarist's supplies. The destruction of Ya' Dich-Gho is described in "When Death Came to Bod Reef"; the city's history in "Herr Goering's Artefact" and the life of the survivors in "Three Weeks of Bliss".

References

Citations

Primary sources
  Definitive version.

Secondary sources

 
—"Deep Ones", pp. 81–82. Ibid.
—"Hydra (Mother Hydra)", p. 143. Ibid.
—"Y'ha-nthlei", p. 340. Ibid.

  Robert M. Price (ed.) Bloomfield, NJ: Miskatonic University Press.

External links 

 The Shadow Over Innsmouth by H. P. Lovecraft

Cthulhu Mythos species
Fictional amphibians
Literary characters introduced in 1931
Fictional water monsters
Fictional species and races
Horror film villains
Literary villains
Underwater civilizations in fiction
The Shadow over Innsmouth
Piscine and amphibian humanoids